is a railway station on the Tokyu Oimachi Line in Shinagawa, Tokyo, Japan, operated by the private railway operator Tokyu Corporation.

Station layout
The station consists of two ground-level side platforms serving two tracks. These were originally only long enough to handle three-car trains, and so the doors could not be opened on two out of the five cars on local trains that used the line. On February 24, 2013, the platforms were extended by two car lengths to enable the doors to be opened on all cars of stopping trains.

Platforms

History 
It was renamed Togoshi-koen on January 1, 1936.

The short three-car long platforms were extended to handle five cars from February 24, 2013.

Passenger statistics 
In fiscal 2014, the station was used by an average of 14,102 passengers daily.

Surrounding area
 Togoshi Park

See also
 List of railway stations in Japan

References

External links

  

Railway stations in Tokyo
Railway stations in Japan opened in 1927
Tokyu Oimachi Line
Stations of Tokyu Corporation